The 1946 Houston Cougars football team represented the University of Houston in the 1946 college football season as a member of the Lone Star Conference (LSC). The Cougars were led by head coach Jewell Wallace in his first season and finished with a record of four wins and six losses (4–6 overall, 1–4 in the LSC).

Schedule

References

Houston
Houston Cougars football seasons
Houston Cougars football